Chanda Rubin and Arantxa Sánchez Vicario were the defending champions, but competed this year with different partners. Rubin teamed up with Brenda Schultz-McCarthy and were eliminated in the third round, while Sánchez Vicario teamed up with Gigi Fernández and lost in the semifinals.

Martina Hingis and Natasha Zvereva won the title, defeating Lindsay Davenport and Lisa Raymond 6–2, 6–2 in the final. It was the 1st Australian Open, 2nd Grand Slam and 4th overall doubles title for Hingis, and the 3rd Australian Open, 16th Grand Slam and 61st overall doubles title for Zvereva, in their respective careers.

Seeds

Draw

Finals

Top half

Section 1

Section 2

Bottom half

Section 3

Section 4

External links
 1997 Australian Open – Women's draws and results at the International Tennis Federation
 Official Results Archive (Australian Open)

Women's Doubles
Australian Open (tennis) by year – Women's doubles
1997 in Australian women's sport